Hair of the Dog is a 1962 British comedy film directed by Terry Bishop and starring Reginald Beckwith, Dorinda Stevens and John Le Mesurier. Fred Tickle is commissionaire at a razor blade factory, and grows a beard after developing a shaving rash, but his new appearance doesn't go down well with management.

Cast
 Reginald Beckwith as Fred Tickle
 Dorinda Stevens as Ann Tickle
 John Le Mesurier as Sir Mortimer Gallant
 Brian Oulton as Gregory Willett
 Alison Bayley as Violet Tickle
 Harold Goodwin as Percy
 Barbara Windsor as Elsie Grumble
 Stanley Morgan as Jim Lester
 Stanley Unwin as Vicar
 Keith Smith as Interviewer
 Tony Hawes as Mr Rembrandt
 Edward Malin as Sidney
 Raymond Rollett as Arthur
 Cardew Robinson as Doctor

References

External links

1962 films
1962 comedy films
British comedy films
Films directed by Terry Bishop
1960s English-language films
1960s British films